

Hashmat Khan Park aka Kul-e-Heshmat Khan is a waterfowl sanctuary and protected area located in Kabul, Afghanistan.

History 
In June 2017 the Ministry of Agriculture, Irrigation and Livestock announced Kul-e-Heshmat Khan as the fourth national park on the occasion of World Environment Day.

References

National parks of Afghanistan
Lakes of Afghanistan
Protected areas established in 2017
2017 establishments in Afghanistan

Important Bird Areas of Afghanistan
Landforms of Kabul Province
Reservoirs in Afghanistan
Geography of Kabul Province
Parks in Kabul
Kabul Province